Entyloma ageratinae, commonly known as the mist flower smut, is a leaf smut fungus and plant pathogen widely employed as a biological herbicide in the control of the invasive plant Ageratina riparia. The pathogen was first identified in Jamaica in 1974 and was isolated as a distinct species in 1988.

E. ageratinae has been the most effective and widely implemented biological control of A. riparia. The fungus was first identified by scientists searching for a naturally occurring control agent in Jamaica. Specimens were then transported to Hawaii, where they were examined and trialled as a control agent. After the species’ proven success at weakening A. riparia populations, it was implemented in wide reaching projects in Hawaii and New Zealand. The pathogen is now endemic to populations in Hawaii, New Zealand, Australia, and to a lesser extent, in South Africa.

Taxonomy 
The fungus was initially considered a species within the Cercosporella genus, and has formerly been referred to as Cercosporella argeratina (nomen nudum). The species was later named Entyloma compositarum. In 1988, Entyloma ageratinae was isolated as a separate species from E. compositarum by R.W. Barreto and H.C. Evans. Other authorities on the field, however, argue it should instead be classified as the forma specialis E. compostarum f. sp. Ageratinae. Description 
The fungus grows almost exclusively on A. riparia plants. The only other known species to develop symptoms of the disease is Ageratina adenophora. Though the two species are closely related, the disease's effects on A. adenophora are comparatively benign; it does not form spores and produces only small lesions. Contraction by A. adenophora is rare, and has only been documented in laboratory trials.E. ageratinae is both a biotrophic and necrotropic pathogen, consuming both living and dead matter. The fungus initially forms small, circular chloratic lesions on the upper surface of living A. riparia leaves. These lesions expand, darken and turn reddish-brown as the pathogen becomes necrotic. White, aseptate, holoblastic spores form on the underside of leaves 7–10 days after infection. Infected leaves eventually wilt and fall off the main plant prematurely, stunting its growth. The fungus may also cause shoots to die off.

The species has a short life cycle and spreads most quickly in windy environments with heavy rainfall. Temperatures above 20ºC are fatal to it.

 Biological control agent 

 Hawaii A. riparia was first introduced to Hawaii as an ornamental plant around 1925 and is locally known as Hamakua pa-makani. The plant was first documented as naturalised near Hilo in 1926. It thrived in the moist climate of Hawaii, preferring ditches and low pastures. By 1930, it had spread to much of the northwest of the island. Mid-19th century methods to control the plant on the island included spraying affected areas with a solution of arsenic or calcium chlorate. These early methods were not only toxic to the native ecosystem, but proved ineffective at limiting the spread of the plant. By 1973, A. riparia had infested an estimated 62,500 ha of the island of Hawaii.

A $10,000 grant provided by Barbara Cox Anthony funded a total of three trips in search of naturally occurring biological control agents for the A. riparia. The first two trips to the species’ center of origin in Mexico in 1973 and 1974 were ultimately unsuccessful. A rust fungus was identified in El Mirador, but limited biological information meant that it could not be transported back to Hawaii because of pathogenic quarantine regulations. A third expedition made to Jamaica in 1974 successfully discovered diseased plants in the Blue Mountains. Importantly, none of the adjacent crops or flora in Jamaica showed symptoms of infection by the pathogen. Because the fungus appeared highly specific to the A. riparia, it was permitted for live transportation to Hawaii by the Department of Agriculture and the Federal Animal and Plant Health Inspection Service. Diseased branches of the plant were collected and placed in iced plastic bags. On arrival to Hawaii 48 hours later, five diseased leaves had survived the trip. These five leaves were used as the initial sources of inoculation for Hawaiian A. riparia plants in a quarantine terrarium in Manoa.

A host-range study was conducted in 1974 which concluded that E. ageratinae was specific to A. riparia and did not pose a significant threat to native flora. A permit was granted by Hawaii’s Board of Agriculture for field inoculations of the fungus in 1975. A 1975 field test conducted on the Tantalus Ridge on Oahu proved the species' success as a biological agent. Initial assessments showed that the ridge was 80% covered by A. riparia. Within nine months, its population had dropped to less than 1%. Final assessments in 1975 concluded that the species is under control at the site, and most of the ground space formerly occupied by the plant is now covered by indigenous plant species.

Further inoculations were made at infested sites on Oahu and the island of Hawaii. No inoculations were made on Maui, but the disease was discovered at the 7 Pools in Maui six months after an inoculation at Kona. The pathogen appeared to have spread voluntarily across the ʻAlenuihāhā Channel. By 1985, more than 50,000 ha of rangeland had been restored. The majority of Hawaiian rangelands had been fully restored by 1992. The success of the disease’s spread correlates to the amount of rainfall; it spreads more effectively in moist areas. As of 2005, some plants survive in regions which receive ca. 0.90 m/annum of precipitation. A. riparia is currently classified as under control in Hawaii. No evidence of pathogenic mutation of E. ageratinae or its spread to other species has been documented on the islands.

 New Zealand A. riparia was first introduced to New Zealand as an ornamental plant in the 1930s. It quickly spread and became naturalised on the North Island. It proved particularly invasive in open areas, on slopes, and on the edges of forests and wetlands. In areas where the plant was dominant, sediment built up more quickly and slopes were less stable than with native ground cover. The species often overtook and smothered flora less than a meter tall. It posed a threat to the ecosystem on the whole, but In 1996, it was reported as an active threat to two native plants in particular: Veronica bishopiana and Veronica rivalis (syn. Hebe acutiflora).

Following the success of the biological control program in Hawaii, a similar approach was adopted. Test trials of E. ageratinae were run which exposed 35 plant species to the pathogen. Only A. riparia and A. adenophora developed spores symptomatic of the fungus. As A. adenophora is also invasive in New Zealand and it only experienced mild effects of the disease, its possible contraction of the disease was not a concern. The New Zealand Ministry of Agriculture permitted the pathogen to be released in 1998. Host specimens were sent from Hawaii on 5 October 1998. These were released at nine infestation sites by the end of the year. The fungus spread quickly across the North Island, both through wind dispersal of spores and by inadvertent trafficking by humans and other animals. The warm and breezy climate of the North Island likely contributed to the rapid spread of the disease. It is now endemic to the plants on the North Island. On average, the population of A. riparia declined by 85% as a result of the introduction of A. ageratinae in New Zealand, and native cover has returned to the areas affected.

 South Africa A. riparia was first introduced to South Africa during the early 20th century. The first known specimen of the species was documented in 1955, in Chase Valley, Pietermaritzburg. From Chase valley it spread to Hilton and Sweetwaters, but has remained largely confined to these areas. Diseased A. riparia leaves were secured from the University of Hawaii in November 1986 and E. ageratinae was introduced to South Africa via the Hawaiian specimens in November, 1989 at a single inoculation site in Hilton. By 1990, the disease was well established in the area.

Some researchers have noted that although A. riparia is not native to South Africa, it was not at high risk of becoming invasive. The plant thrives in warm, moist climates, and the majority of the country does not receive enough precipitation to foster such growth. However, significant areas of land which are untouched by the plant would be ideal for its growth. Since the introduction of E. ageratinae, the plant has not spread beyond its existing area The introduction of the pathogen in South Africa was a more precautionary and preventive measure as compared to the reconciliatory efforts of Hawaii and New Zealand.

 Australia A. riparia was first introduced to New South Wales as an ornamental plant in around 1875. The species was cultivated by botanical gardens in Adelaide, Melbourne, Sydney, and Brisbane in 1901. It quickly escaped from cultivation and had naturalised in Springbrook by 1930. In 1952, the species was declared a noxious weed in Australia. A. riparia is a most significant threat to native ecosystems in the mountainous regions of southern Queensland and northern New South Wales which receive high precipitation.

Following successful uses of E. ageratinae as a biological control agent in Hawaii and New Zealand, the species was a candidate for similar projects in Australia, but these were never implemented. Without being intentionally introduced, the fungus was identified on mistflower leaves near Lamington National Park on 21 October 2010. Further surveys found that the fungus had become endemic to the northern and central coast in New South Wales, though it had not spread to the south. The fungus was present along much of Australia’s eastern coast, though largely confined to Queensland and New South Wales. Specimens have also been identified on Norfolk Island. In May 2011, further A. riparia plants in New South Wales were intentionally inoculated after host-specificity tests found the fungus was highly specific and did not pose a threat to native flora. These tests found that the pathogen only posed an additional threat to A. adenophora, which is also invasive in the region. By July 2012, the plant cover of A. riparia had decreased at tests sites in New South Wales and Queensland by an average of over 60%.

References

 Further reading 
Barton, Jane; et al. (2007). "Successful biological control of mist fower (Ageratina riparia) in New Zealand: Agent establishment, impact and benefits to the native flora". Biological Control. 40 (3): 270–385.
Barreto R.W., Evans H.C. (1988). "Taxonomy of a fungus introduced into Hawaii for biological control of Ageratina riparia (Eupatorieae; Compositae), with observations on related weed pathogens". Transactions of the British Mycological Society. 91 (1): 81–97.
Trujillo, Eduardo E. (2005). "History and success of plant pathogens for biological control of introduced weeds in Hawaii". Biological Control''. 33: 113–122.

Fungi described in 1988
Fungi of Australia
Fungi of Mexico
Fungi of New Zealand
Fungal plant pathogens and diseases
Ustilaginomycotina
Fungal pest control agents
Fungi without expected TNC conservation status
Invasive plants biological control agents